Mata Gujri Mahila Mahavidyalaya also known as Mata Gujri College is an autonomous college located in Jabalpur. The college was established in the year 1994 and named after the mother of Guru Gobind Singh, Mata Gujri.

Affiliations
The college is recognized as an autonomous college by the University Grants Commission and is affiliated to Rani Durgavati University.

References

External links
 

Women's universities and colleges in Madhya Pradesh
Education in Jabalpur
1994 establishments in Madhya Pradesh
Educational institutions established in 1994